Liuji, derived from the Standard Mandarin pinyin 'Liújí', may refer to:

China
 Liuji Community, Liuji, in Liuji, Dawu County, Xiaogan, Hubei
 Liuji Subdistrict, in Xiangzhou District, Xiangyang, Hubei

Towns 
The following towns are known as Liújí in Standard Mandarin pinyin:

 Liuji, Guzhen County, in Guzhen County, Bengbu, Anhui
 Liuji, Dengzhou, in Dengzhou, Nanyang, Henan
 Liuji, Zhongmu County, in Zhongmu County, Zhengzhou, Henan
 Liuji, Xiaogan, in Dawu County, Xiaogan, Hubei
 Liuji, Shuyang County, in Shuyang County, Suqian, Jiangsu
 Liuji, Xuzhou, in Tongshan District, Xuzhou, Jiangsu
 Liuji, Yizheng, in Yizheng, Yangzhou, Jiangsu
 Liuji, Shaanxi, in Fuping County, Weinan, Shaanxi
 Liuji, Shandong, in Dong'e County, Liaocheng, Shandong

Townships 
The following locations are known as Liuji Township:
 Liuji Township, Fengtai County, in Fengtai County, Huainan, Anhui
 Liuji Township, Yingshang County, in Yingshang County, Fuyang, Anhui
 Liuji Township, Gansu, in Jishishan Bonan, Dongxiang and Salar Autonomous County, Linxia Hui Autonomous Prefecture, Gansu
 Liuji Township, Hebei, in Jing County, Hengshui, Hebei
 Liuji Township, Henan, in Yucheng County, Shangqiu, Henan

Villages 
Liuji, Wulipu, in Wulipu, Shayang County, Jingmen, Hubei
Liuji Village, Liuji, in Liuji, Dawu County, Xiaogan, Hubei
Liuji, Zhucheng, in Zhucheng Subdistrict, Xinzhou District, Wuhan, Hubei

See also 
 Dongliuji, a town in Wuhe County, Bengbu, Anhui
 Xiangyang Liuji Airport, an airport in Xiangyang, Hubei